Lacko may refer to:

Lukáš Lacko, Slovak tennis player
Łącko (disambiguation), several places in Poland
Läckö, Vänern island in Lidköping Municipality, Sweden